Rogers is a city located in Hennepin County, Minnesota, United States. The population was 13,295 at the 2020 census. In 2012, the city the annexed the surrounding Hassan Township. The City of Rogers is considered a northwest suburb of the Minneapolis–Saint Paul metropolitan area. The city’s economy is mostly based on industrial activity and agriculture.  

The city is located on either side of Interstate 94, with Minnesota State Highway 101 running north and its western boundary touches the Crow River.

Geography

Upon the 2012 annexation of Hassan Township, the total land area of the City grew to approximately 26 square miles.

History
In the 1880s, John Rogers sold an acre of his land, then part of Hassan Township, to Great Northern Railroad for a dollar. The new depot provided a convenient stop for the rich timber resources of the area, and served as the beginning ground of a new community. When St. Martin Catholic Church and school were added, Rogers grew in local importance, consequently causing new businesses to be built and the town to be regarded as more of a local hub than other nearby communities such as Fletcher. In 1914, the city was incorporated.

Throughout the years the town grew slowly until, in 1972, Interstate 94 was constructed. Running right through Rogers, the new freeway provided easy access to Minneapolis and Saint Paul, causing additional businesses such as Graco, CDI, Dept. 56 and Reinhart FoodService to add operations. The additional jobs created new population growth. As growth occurred, additional land was required, causing Rogers to annex more and more land from the surrounding Hassan Township. Hassan was completely annexed into Rogers on January 1, 2012.

Early founding families names still serve as key contributors to the community. Otto Scharber was a prominent local businessman, owning a grocery store, hardware store, and a John Deere implement dealership, which is still in family operation today.

Tornado
On September 16, 2006, an F2 tornado damaged homes in Rogers, killing one person.
The tornado began three miles west of Rogers at 9:52 p.m. The tornado made its first strike on Rogers at 9:54 p.m. The tornado traveled along a path that was eight miles, and lasted for approximately 12 minutes. The tornado also resulted in six injuries and the death of a 10 year old girl, Jayme Wendt

Annexation of Hassan Township
On January 1, 2012, Hassan Township, Hennepin County's last township, was completely annexed into Rogers. Talks of annexation between Rogers and Hassan Township can be traced back to the 1970s, but the formal agreement was approved on December 30, 2003. In 2008, the Rogers City Council and the Hassan Town Board accelerated the annexation date to January 1, 2012. This was the third and final phase of annexation, boosting the Rogers population to over 11,000 residents.

Education
Rogers has multiple schools within its borders, including four public schools: Rogers Elementary, Hassan Elementary, Rogers Middle School, and Rogers High School, with the mascot being the Rogers Royal. Numerous private schools have also cropped up over the city's history. Rogers High School was ranked #32 in Minnesota for 2018 by U.S. News & World Report based on performance on state-required tests and how well they prepare students for college.

Demographics

2010 census
As of the census of 2010, there were 8,597 people, 2,882 households, and 2,190 families living in the city. The racial makeup of the city was 91.3% White, 2.4% African American, 0.1% Native American, 3.5% Asian, 0.6% from other races, and 2.1% from two or more races. Hispanic or Latino of any race were 1.9% of the population.

There were 2,882 households, of which 52.1% had children under the age of 18 living with them, 65.3% were married couples living together, 7.3% had a female householder with no husband present, 3.4% had a male householder with no wife present, and 24.0% were non-families. 19.8% of all households were made up of individuals, and 9.3% had someone living alone who was 65 years of age or older. The average household size was 2.95 and the average family size was 3.45.

The median age in the city was 33.5 years. 34.9% of residents were under the age of 18; 5.3% were between the ages of 18 and 24; 33.5% were from 25 to 44; 18% were from 45 to 64; and 8.4% were 65 years of age or older. The gender makeup of the city was 49.2% male and 50.8% female.

2000 census
As of the census of 2000, there were 3,588 people, 1,195 households, and 982 families living in the city. The racial makeup of the city was 97.10% White, 0.36% African American, 0.03% Native American, 0.67% Asian, 0.36% from other races, and 1.48% from two or 
more races. Hispanic or Latino of any race were 0.98% of the population.

There were 1,195 households, out of which 52.6% had children while under the age of 18, living with them, 77.2% were married couples living together, 3.2% had a female householder with no husband present, and 17.8% were non-families. 13.3% of all households were made up of individuals, and 4.7% had someone living alone who was 65 years of age or older.  The average household size was 2.98 and the average family size was 3.31.

In the city, the population was spread out, with 33.8% under the age of 18, 4.6% from 18 to 24, 44.5% from 25 to 44, 11.9% from 45 to 64, and 5.3% who were 65 years of age or older.  The median age was 31 years. For every 100 females, there were 100.4 males.  For every 100 females age 18 and over, there were 101.8 males.

The median income for a household in the city was $73,143, and the median income for a family was $76,984. Males had a median income of $46,496 versus $35,869 for females. The per capita income for the city was $25,845.  About 0.4% of families and 1.8% of the population were below the poverty line, including 0.1% of those under age 18 and 5.9% of those age 65 or over.

References

External links
 City of Rogers – Official Website

Cities in Hennepin County, Minnesota
Cities in Minnesota
Populated places established in 1914
1914 establishments in Minnesota